The 1845 Grand Liverpool Steeplechase was the seventh annual running of a Handicap Steeple-chase, later to become known as the Grand National Steeplechase, a horse race which took place at Aintree Racecourse near Liverpool on Wednesday 5 March 1845 and attracted a field of 15 runners. It was won by the unconsidered outsider Cure-All, ridden by William Loft in a record time of 10 minutes, 47 seconds.

The Course
The report published by the reporter of the Liverpool Mercury was the only contemporary record of both the course and the race. It stated that the course had not changed from the previous year and was completely run on grass with the exception of the starting field and a large field near the Canal bridge. The fourteenth fence, which had been an artificial hurdle at the distance judges chair was replaced with a stone wall

Start – Just beyond the Melling Road. Fence 1 [17] on the second circuit] Plain good fence. Fence 2 [18] Plain good fence. Fence 3 [19] Plain good fence. Fence 4 [20] Plain good fence. Fence 5 [21] The Upper Brook, where Captain Beecher fell in 1839. Fence 6 [22] A fence inclined to the left that takes the runners towards the Canal side. Fence 7 [23] A fence inclined to the left that takes the runners towards the Canal side. Fence 8 [24] A fence inclined to the left that takes the runners towards the Canal side. Fence 9 [25] A large water jump. Fence 10 [26] Out of the second field along the Canal. Fence 11 [27] Out of the third field along the Canal. Fence 12 [28] A fence into the Anchor Bridge Road. Fence 13 An artificial hurdle leaving the training ground on the racecourse proper. Fence 14 A stone wall [reintroduced after having been removed the previous year for an artificial hurdle]. Fence 15 An artificial brook twelve feet wide with a three-foot rail [this description being a foot narrower than the previous reported description]. Fence 16 A bank into the Melling Road. Fence 29 An artificial hurdle adjacent to the distance chair on the run in.

On jumping fence twelve the runners would continue onto the widest part of the course, known as the training ground, making the straight along the stands as long as possible a run before starting the second circuit. After jumping fence twenty-eight the runners would turn towards the racecourse at an earlier point, this time jumping the hurdle on the other side of the distance judge's chair.

Finishing order

Details
The race was delayed due to a protest from the owners of Cure-All and Crocus over the condition of the course. Heavy rain, followed by a sharp overnight frost left parts of the course in a very hard condition, which the two owners felt was unsafe for racing. The race commenced at 5pm after the remaining owners had voted to race. The owner of Crocus, Mr Robson withdrew his horse while Cure-All went on to win.

Only the first four horses to pass the finishing post were recorded as official finishers to the race. Another seven horse were recorded by the press as having passed the post but they were so far behind that they all finished among the many spectators who would follow the race on horse back and would enter the course when the winner passed the post. It may be that some, if not all of those who finished outside the first four bypassed the final obstacles. Another possible reason why they were not recorded as finishers is that a distance judge used to sit at a position beside the modern day chair fence and would declare any horse who had not reached his position by the time the previous horse passed the post as being distanced and would pull them up.

The winning owner and rider was William loft from Healing, Lincolnshire near Grimsby, although he leased the ownership of the horse to Mr Sterling Crawford for the Grand National. Loft also officially trained the horse as well but this duty was more likely handled by Christopher Crisp, known as Kitty. Crisp actually walked every step of the road from Grimsby to Liverpool with the horse and after their victory they returned home the same way with the Healing church bells sounded in their honour upon their arrival.

Loft was one of nine riders making their debut in the race while Tom Olliver was taking a record seventh ride in the race.

Clansman's fatal fall at the Canal Turn was the second equine fatality in the history of the race and the first for six years.

Sources

Irish Newsletter 1845
The Times 1845
Liverpool Mercury 1845
The Field 1954

Grand National
 1845
Grand National
19th century in Lancashire
March 1845 sports events